is a mountain located in the centre of the Akaishi Mountains−Southern Alps, within Minami Alps National Park, Japan. It is on the border of Shizuoka and Nagano Prefectures.  It is one of the 100 Famous Japanese Mountains.  

At 3,047 m tall, it is the 16th tallest mountains and hills of Japan. There is the mountaineering route on from a ridge in Akaishi Mountains.

History 
 1902 - Toranosuke Ienaka climbed the top for the Surveying investigation. Afterwards, the Triangulation station was set up in the peak on the west side.
 1964 - The Mount Shiomi region was specified for the new Minami Alps National Park. 
 1977 - Shiomi mountain hut was built on the west of the summit .

Gallery

References

See also 
 List of mountains in Japan
 100 Famous Japanese Mountains
 Three-thousanders (in Japan)
 Akaishi Mountains
 Minami Alps National Park

Akaishi Mountains
Mount Shiomi
Mountains of Nagano Prefecture
Mountains of Shizuoka Prefecture
Mount Shiomi